Válgame Dios, is a Venezuelan telenovela produced by Carolina de Jacobo for Venevisión.

Sabrina Seara and Eduardo Orozco star as the main protagonists while Ricardo Alamo, Carlota Sosa and Raquel Yanez star as the main antagonists.

From March 13, 2012 to October 3, 2012, Venevisión broadcast ¡Válgame Dios! replacing Natalia del Mar. Official production of Válgame Dios began on November 28, 2011.

The finale episode on Venevisión received a high rating of 63.4% audience share.

Plot

The women in the Lopez clan have suffered a terrible curse that has lasted for 100 years. This curse prevents them from having true love. They always fall on the misfortune of falling in love with two men: one a wonderful man who is serious and responsible while the other is an irresponsible scoundrel, but they end up choosing the bad one.

Yamilet Lopez (Sabrina Seara), like all the Lopez women, is beautiful, smart, funny, hardworking and caring. She also falls victim to the family curse. On the day of her job interview, she meets two men. Ignacio Castillo (Eduardo Orozco) is a taxi driver and fireman who is sweet, kind and responsible and Jose Alberto Gamboa (Ricardo Alamo), a mischievous womanizer who has been married for 25 years to Mariela (Gigi Zanchetta) a high school guidance counselor and has a mistress Dinorah (Flavia Gleske) who he has been seeing for 10 years.

Both men will try to conquer Yamilet's heart. However, she doesn't know who is the good one or who is the bad one.

The Lopez women have hope that the curse can be broken. What they do not know is that it all depends on a secret that Marbelis Castillo (Carlota Sosa) Ignacio's mother knows. Everyone believes that she is a saint, but in reality she is an evil woman that will stop at nothing, even to the extent of killing, to make sure that her secret is not revealed.

Cast

Main cast 
Sabrina Seara as Yamilet López
Eduardo Orozco as Ignacio "Nacho" Castillo
Ricardo Álamo as José Alberto Gamboa

Also as main cast 
Jean Carlo Simancas as Inocente Castillo
Flavia Gleske as Dinorah Calcaño
Gigi Zanchetta as Mariela Campos de Gamboa
Roberto Messutti as Cayo Castillo Rodríguez
Rosmeri Marval as Kimberly Castillo Rodríguez
Estefanía López as Gabriela "Gaby" Gamboa Campos
Arán de las Casas as Héctor Zubizarrieta
Raquel Yánez as Nieves Pérez

Supporting cast 
Carlota Sosa as Marbelis Rodríguez de Castillo
Beatriz Valdés as Guillermina López
Virginia Urdaneta as Mércedes Rodriguez
Aura Rivas as Gumercinda López
María Cristina Lozada as Eduvigis Martinez
Judith Vásquez as Luz Moncada
Juan Carlos Gardié as Jesús "Chuo" Calcaño
Alejandro Mata as Remberto Pérez
Pedro Durán as Padre Efrain
Yuvana Montalvo as Mayerling Torres
Erick Ronsó as Jefferson José Bracho
Alexander Da Silva as Remigio Pérez
Gabriela Santeliz as Andreína
Anthony Lorusso as Pablo
Absalom de los Rios as Constantino "Tino" Durán
Michelle Taurel as Ligia Elena Sarría
Ever Bastidas as Alberto José Gamboa Campos
Hernán Iturbe as Joya Uribe
Franco Purroy as Brad Pitt Sarría

Special participation 
Luz Marina Peña
Mayra Moreno
Thaimar Rodríguez
Jordán Peña
Danny Valdivieso
Daniel Méndez
Dorian Laya
Ricardo Zerpa
Rafael Alcalde
Viviana Ramos as La Nueva 3° de Gamboa
María Antonieta Duque as Gloria Zamora
Elba Escobar as La bruja del maleficio
Beba Rojas as La peor es nada
Josué Villae as Ángel
Claudia La Gatta as Liseth
José Gabriel Madonia as  Augusto "Guto" Vázco

Venezuela broadcast
 Release dates, episode name & length, based on Venevisión's broadcast.

Awards

Premios Inter 2013

References 

Spanish-language telenovelas
Venezuelan telenovelas
2012 telenovelas
2012 Venezuelan television series debuts
2012 Venezuelan television series endings
Venevisión telenovelas
Television shows set in Caracas